The Seattle Seven is a group of seven seafood companies, operating in the city of Seattle, known for negotiating a secret agreement with Exxon Corporation in 1991, relating to punitive damages resulting from the Exxon Valdez oil spill. The companies, Aleutian Dragon Fisheries (ADF), Icicle Seafoods, North Coast Seafood Processors, North Pacific Processors, Ocean Beauty Seafoods, Trident Seafoods and Wards Cove Packing Co. were paid $63.75 million.

References

1991 in Alaska
Companies based in Seattle
Exxon Valdez oil spill